Ramón Belloso (1810–1858) was a Salvadoran military man born in San Salvador who helped expel the filibuster William Walker from Nicaragua.

Salvadoran military personnel
1810 births
1858 deaths
Deaths from cholera